大興 or 大兴 may refer to:
Daxing (disambiguation)
Daeheung (disambiguation)
Tai Hing Estate, a public housing estate in Tuen Mun, New Territories, Hong Kong